In mathematical analysis, the Hardy–Littlewood inequality, named after G. H. Hardy and John Edensor Littlewood, states that if  and  are nonnegative measurable real functions vanishing at infinity that are defined on -dimensional Euclidean space , then

 and 

Proof

  and 

Now the proof can be obtained by first using Fubini's theorem to interchange the order of integration.

Denoting by  the -dimensional Lebesgue measure we continue by estimating the volume of the intersection by the minimum of the volumes of the two sets. Then, we can use the equality of the volumes of the superlevel sets for the rearrangements:

The last identity follows by reversing the initial five steps that even work for general functions. This finishes the proof.

An application 

The technique that is used to obtain the above property of the Normal distribution can be utilized for other unimodal distributions.

See also
 Rearrangement inequality
 Chebyshev's sum inequality
 Lorentz space

References

Inequalities
Articles containing proofs